The 2018 Austrian Darts Open was the fourth out of thirteen PDC European Tour events on the 2018 PDC Pro Tour. The tournament took place at Steiermarkthalle, Premstätten, Austria between 20–22 April 2018. It featured a field of 48 players and £135,000 in prize money, with £25,000 going to the winner.

Michael van Gerwen was the defending champion after defeating Michael Smith 6–5 in the final of the 2017 tournament, although he withdrew prior to the tournament beginning.

Jonny Clayton (who became a seeded player following van Gerwen's withdrawal) defeated fellow Welshman Gerwyn Price 8–5, in what was both their first PDC European Tour final, and which was the second European Tour in a row where a debutant finalist won the event (following on from Max Hopp in the 2018 German Darts Open the previous week).

Prize money 
This is how the prize money is divided:

Prize money will count towards the PDC Order of Merit, the ProTour Order of Merit and the European Tour Order of Merit, with one exception: should a seeded player lose in the second round (last 32), their prize money will not count towards any Orders of Merit, although they still receive the full prize money payment.

Qualification and format 
The top 16 entrants from the PDC ProTour Order of Merit on 27 February will automatically qualify for the event and will be seeded in the second round.

The remaining 32 places will go to players from five qualifying events – 18 from the UK Qualifier (held in Barnsley on 9 March), eight from the West/South European Qualifier (held on 12 April), four from the Host Nation Qualifier (held on 19 April), one from the Nordic & Baltic Qualifier (held on 23 February) and one from the East European Qualifier (held on 28 January).

Michael van Gerwen, who would have been the number 1 seed, withdrew from the tournament prior to the draw. Jonny Clayton, the highest-ranked qualifier, was promoted to 16th seed, with an extra place being made available in the Host Nation Qualifier.

Dave Chisnall withdrew with injury on the day of the tournament, so Wayne Jones, who was due to face him in round 2, was given a bye to round 3.

The following players will take part in the tournament:

Top 16
  Peter Wright (second round)
  Rob Cross (quarter-finals)
  Michael Smith (quarter-finals)
  Daryl Gurney (quarter-finals)
  Mensur Suljović (semi-finals)
  Joe Cullen (semi-finals)
  Dave Chisnall (withdrew)
  Ian White (quarter-finals)
  Simon Whitlock (third round)
  Gerwyn Price (runner-up)
  Mervyn King (third round)
  Jelle Klaasen (second round)
  Darren Webster (third round)
  Benito van de Pas (second round)
  Steve Beaton (third round)
  Jonny Clayton (champion)

UK Qualifier
  Cameron Menzies (first round)
  John Henderson (first round)
  Stephen Burton (first round)
  Luke Humphries (second round)
  Brendan Dolan (second round)
  James Wade (third round)
  Michael Barnard (second round)
  Alan Tabern (first round)
  Jason Cullen (second round)
  Steve West (second round)
  Wayne Jones (third round)
  Simon Stevenson (first round)
  Richie Burnett (second round)
  Steve Lennon (second round)
  Ritchie Edhouse (first round)
  Adam Hunt (second round)
  Scott Taylor (second round)

West/South European Qualifier
  Cristo Reyes (third round)
  Ron Meulenkamp (second round)
  Max Hopp (second round)
  Simeon Heinz (first round)
  Kevin Münch (first round)
  Gabriel Clemens (first round)
  Dimitri Van den Bergh (third round)
  Ronny Huybrechts (first round)

Host Nation Qualifier
  Bastian Pietschnig (first round)
  Hannes Schnier (first round)
  Dietmar Burger (first round)
  Roxy-James Rodriguez (first round)
  Alex Steinbauer (first round)

Nordic & Baltic Qualifier
  Darius Labanauskas (second round)

East European Qualifier
  Tamás Alexits (first round)

Draw

References 

2018 PDC European Tour
2018 in Austrian sport
April 2018 sports events in Austria
Sport in Styria